Ethiopic Extended is a Unicode block containing Geʽez characters for the Me'en, Blin, and Sebatbeit languages.

Block

History
The following Unicode-related documents record the purpose and process of defining specific characters in the Ethiopic Extended block:

References 

Unicode blocks